In mathematical logic, specifically in the discipline of model theory, the Fraïssé limit (also called the Fraïssé construction or Fraïssé amalgamation) is a method used to construct (infinite) mathematical structures from their (finite) substructures. It is a special example of the more general concept of a direct limit in a category. The technique was developed in the 1950s by its namesake, French logician Roland Fraïssé.

The main point of Fraïssé's construction is to show how one can approximate a (countable) structure by its finitely generated substructures.

The general study of Fraïssé limits and related notions is sometimes called Fraïssé theory. This field has seen wide applications to other parts of mathematics, including topological dynamics, functional analysis, and Ramsey theory.

Finitely generated substructures and age 
Fix a language . By an -structure, we mean a logical structure having signature .

Given an -structure  with domain , and a subset , we use  to denote the least substructure of  whose domain contains  (i.e. the closure of  under all the function and constant symbols in ).

One can prove that any class  that is the age of some structure satisfies the following two conditions:

Hereditary property (HP)

Joint embedding property (JEP)

Fraïssé's theorem 

As above, we noted that for any -structure ,  satisfies the HP and JEP. Fraïssé proved a sort-of-converse result: when  is any non-empty, countable set of finitely generated -structures that has the above two properties, then it is the age of some countable structure.

Furthermore, suppose that  happens to satisfy the following additional properties.

Amalgamation property (AP)

Essential countability (EC)

In that case, we say that K is a Fraïssé class, and there is a unique (up to isomorphism), countable, homogeneous structure  whose age is exactly .

Here, homogeneous means that any isomorphism  between two finitely generated substructures  can be extended to an automorphism of the whole structure.

Examples 
The archetypal example is the class  of all finite linear orderings, for which the Fraïssé limit is a dense linear order without endpoints (i.e. no smallest nor largest element). By Cantor's isomorphism theorem, up to isomorphism, this is always equivalent to the structure , i.e. the rational numbers with the usual ordering.

This is because, although both of them are countable and have  as their age, neither one is homogeneous.

Another example is the class  of all finite graphs, whose Fraïssé limit is the Rado graph.

ω-categoricity 
Suppose our class  under consideration satisfies the additional property of being uniformly locally finite, which means that for every , there is a uniform bound on the size of an -generated substructure. This condition is equivalent to the Fraïssé limit of  being ω-categorical.

For example, the class of finite dimensional vector spaces over a fixed field is always a Fraïssé class, but it is uniformly locally finite only if the field is finite.

See also 
 Structural Ramsey theory
 Hrushovski construction

References

Category theory
Mathematical logic
Model theory